The Saint Joseph's Institution Military Band (SJIMB) is a symphonic band with a military aspect. It is the main band that plays for the school's Annual Parades and other school functions.

In the early years of the SJIMB, it was the first school military band that played for the National Day Parade in 1966, which then started the series of school bands being involved in the National Day Parades of Singapore.

The SJIMB was one of the earliest bands founded in Singapore.

History 
The SJIMB was founded in 1957 under the blessings of the then Brother Director of SJI, Brother Lawrence Robless and the first Drum Major of the band was Adrian Villaneuva. It only consisted of a Bugle and Fife Band then.

In 1963, the band began to receive its Brass and Woodwind components, making the band become a full military band. 

Recently, as early as 2010, the band has started to change from being a full-time military band into becoming more focused on its concert aspect. albeit while still retaining its military traditions. It continues to do marching performances during the school's parades, but on other times, it does concert music and participates in the Singapore Youth Festival.

Achievements 
Most of the band's competitions are just the biannually-held Singapore Youth Festival. 

In 2009's Singapore Youth Festival Central Judging, the band clinched the Gold With Honours award under the leadership of Drum Major Brian Ng, and under the baton of Mr Tan Thiam Hee. It is the highest achievable award in that competition and was one of the top 10 bands in the competition to do so.

Due to the circumstances posed by COVID-19, SJIMB sent two groups to compete in SYF in 2021, and both teams achieved Distinction. The choice pieces were "Starlight Wink" and "The Phantom of the Dark Hollow."

SYF Central Judging for Concert Bands Medal Tally:-Gold with Honours: 2009Gold: 1999Silver: 2001, 2003, 2005, 2007, 2011Distinction: 2013, 2015, 2017, 2019, 2021*

Conductors 
The Band has two music directors, one of which is in charge of the main band (Secondary 2-4) and the other in charge of the Secondary One new recruits (Mdm Yue Ai Chuan). There is also a student conductor (Band Major) appointed by the teachers-in-charge from the leading batch of that year. Mr Tan Thiam Hee was the music director until December 2011, Mr Darence Leng was the music director until June 2019 and the current music director is Mdm Tan Soh Hwa.

Concerts 
Every two years, the Band organises a concert for the public to watch. The concerts are generally called Renaissance, and the most recent concert, Renaissance XXI was held on 26 May 2018 at CJC. The Band only started to have Renaissance concerts in the late 1990s.

The Band also holds some smaller concerts, especially during overseas and local exchanges.

In 2022, SJIMB performed at the Esplanade as one of the shows for their "In Youthful Company" exhibition.

See also
Singapore Armed Forces Band
Gurkha Contingent Pipes and Drums Platoon

Singaporean marching bands
Musical groups established in 1957
Singaporean concert bands